Kenneth John Warren (25 September 1929 – 27 August 1973) was an Australian actor.

Bald and heavily built, Warren went to North Sydney Boys High School. He started acting in 1949.

He emigrated to the UK in the late 1950s, after appearing in the West End with the Australian play Summer of the Seventeenth Doll. He played many character roles on film and TV, often villainous, until his death aged 43. Among his television roles were the Danger Man episode "The Paper Chase"; and as the diabolical film director Z.Z. von Schnerk in The Avengers episode "Epic"; and in  The Saint episode "The Fiction Makers". He also appeared in an episode of Steptoe and Son ("Cuckoo in the Nest", 1970) as Harold's supposed older half-brother. He also played in the 1968 West End musical production of the ‘’Canterbury Tales’’, as The Miller.
In 1972, he appeared in one episode of the ITV show, 'The Frighteners', with Brian Glover  called 'The Minder'. 

Away from acting, Warren ran a restaurant with his wife Eileen in London in the late 60s. He died of a heart attack at his home near London in 1973 and was survived by his wife and two children.

Selected filmography

Long John Silver (1954)
Three in One (1957) - Andy (segment "Joe Wilson's Mates") 
Kill Me Tomorrow (1957)
I Was Monty's Double (1958) - F / O Davies
The Navy Lark (1959) - Brown
Life in Emergency Ward 10 (1959) - Porter
The Siege of Pinchgut (1959) - Police Commissioner 
I'm All Right Jack (1959) - Card Player 
Woman's Temptation (1959) - Warner
Danger Tomorrow (1960) - Patient (uncredited)
Circus of Horrors (1960) - First Roustabout (uncredited)
Surprise Package (1960) - Lecherous Man (uncredited)
The Criminal (1960) - Clobber
Scotland Yard (1961, Episode: "The Grand Junction Case") - Brown
Doctor Blood's Coffin (1961) - Sgt. Cook
Strip Tease Murder (1961) - Branco
The Frightened City (1961) - Title Thug 
On the Fiddle (1961) - Dusty
Part-Time Wife (1961) - Drew Tierney
The Boys (1962) - George Tanner
Life for Ruth (1962) - Sergeant Finley
The Small World of Sammy Lee (1963) - Fred
The Informers (1963) - Lou Waites
A High Wind in Jamaica (1965) - Capt. Marpole
The 25th Hour (1967) - Insp. Varga
The Double Man (1967) - Police Chief
Decline and Fall... of a Birdwatcher (1968) - Third Warder
The Fiction-Makers (1968) - Warlock
Journey into Darkness (1968) - Joe Blake (episode 'Paper Dolls')
The Spy Killer (1969) - Diaman
Leo the Last (1970) - Kowalski
The Revolutionary (1970) - Sergeant
I, Monster (1971) - Deane
Demons of the Mind (1972) - Klaus
The Creeping Flesh (1973) - Lenny
Beyond Atlantis (1973)
Digby, the Biggest Dog in the World (1973) - General Frank
S*P*Y*S (1974) - Grubov (final film role)

References

External links

1929 births
1973 deaths
20th-century Australian male actors
Australian male stage actors
Australian male film actors
Australian male television actors
People from New South Wales
Australian emigrants to England
Deaths from coronary artery disease